The Kari-Keen 90 Sioux coupe was a two-seat cabin monoplane.

Development
Kari-Keen was an automotive luggage producer that started in the growing aviation business in 1929. Production of the Sioux coupe began in 1929 and ended on 1 August 1933. The first model, the Kari-Keen 60 Sioux Coup, featured a  Velie M-5 engine. 22 aircraft were built without a type certificate. In 1930, six more model 90s were built with a type certificate. In 1931, the Sioux Aircraft Corporation bought the company assets, changing the name of the Kari-Keen 90 into the Sioux Coupe 90.

Design
The Kari-Keen 90 Sioux Coupe was designed by Swen Swanson and was a two-seat side-by-side high-wing monoplane with conventional landing gear. The wing was fully cantilevered, with skylights built in. The fuel tank sat above the pilot's head and was part of the leading edge. Ole Fahlin built all the propellers and test-flew the aircraft.

Variants
Kari-Keen 60 Sioux coupe
Sioux Coupe 90Lambert R-266 radial engine 90 hp.
Sioux Coupe 90A powered with a 90 hp Brownback Tiger
Sioux Coupe 90B Juniorpowered with a 90 hp Warner Scarab Junior - one built
Sioux Coupe 90C Seniorpowered with a 110 hp Warner Scarab -  one built

Aircraft on display
 A Kari-Keen Sioux Model 90B was displayed at the 1931 Detroit air show.
 In 1977, a restored Kari-Keen 90B Sioux Coupe won Grand Champion Antique at the 1977 EAA Oshkosh Airshow.
 In 1988, a restored Kari-Keen 60 Sioux Coupe won Champion Antique at the 1988 EAA Oshkosh Airshow. This aircraft is now stored at the Reynolds-Alberta Museum.
 A Kari-Keen 90 Sioux Coupe is on display at the Iowa Aviation Museum 
 A Kari-Keen 90A Sioux Coupe is on display at the Sioux City Public Museum, last flown in 2004.

Specifications (Kari-Keen 90-C Sioux coupe)

See also

References

External links

Picture of a Sioux coupe model 90B
Video of Kari Keen Coupe donation

1920s United States civil utility aircraft
Sioux Coupe
High-wing aircraft
Single-engined tractor aircraft
Aircraft first flown in 1929